Super Extra Bonus Party LP is Super Extra Bonus Party's debut Choice Music Prize winning album. It was released on April 13, 2007. It has received much critical acclaim in Ireland and has been called "the most inventive Irish album this decade" and "contender for Irish album of the year". It was nominated for the Choice Music Prize in January 2007, subsequently winning on February 27.

Track listing
 "Adventures" – 4:52
 "On the Skyline" – 3:52
Featuring Nina Hynes
 "Everything Flows" – 3:26
Featuring Paul O'Reilly
 "Softly" – 6:18
 "Mushie Shake" – 4:17
 "Spanik Sabotage" – 6:30
 "Super Noise" – 2:38
Featuring White Noise
 "Son Varios" – 4:04
 "Dorothy Goes Home" – 5:19
Featuring Nina Hynes
 "Favourite Things" – 4:42
 "Erosion" – 4:23
Featuring Iain of Kill City Defectors
 "Drone Rock" – 5:09
 "Propeller" – 6:09

References

2007 debut albums
Choice Music Prize-winning albums
Super Extra Bonus Party albums